The Canton of Blangy-sur-Bresle is a former canton situated in the Seine-Maritime département and in the Haute-Normandie region of northern France. It was disbanded following the French canton reorganisation which came into effect in March 2015. It consisted of 19 communes, which joined the canton of Eu in 2015. It had a total of 10,681 inhabitants (2012).

Geography 
An area of farming, forestry and light industry (especially glassmaking) in the arrondissement of Dieppe, centred on the town of Blangy-sur-Bresle. The altitude varies from 27m (Monchaux-Soreng) to 223m (Villers-sous-Foucarmont) with an average altitude of 122m.

The canton comprised 19 communes:

Aubermesnil-aux-Érables
Bazinval
Blangy-sur-Bresle
Campneuseville
Dancourt
Fallencourt
Foucarmont
Guerville
Hodeng-au-Bosc
Monchaux-Soreng
Nesle-Normandeuse
Pierrecourt
Réalcamp
Rétonval
Rieux
Saint-Léger-aux-Bois
Saint-Martin-au-Bosc
Saint-Riquier-en-Rivière
Villers-sous-Foucarmont

Population

See also 
 Arrondissements of the Seine-Maritime department
 Cantons of the Seine-Maritime department
 Communes of the Seine-Maritime department

References

Blangy-sur-Bresle
2015 disestablishments in France
States and territories disestablished in 2015